SPSL may refer to:
Society for the Protection of Science and Learning, now Council for At-Risk Academics
Society for the Philosophy of Sex and Love
South Puget Sound League, school sports league in Washington state, United States
Southern Premier Soccer League, United States soccer league 2010-2011
 Supplemental paid sick leave